Siegfried Rossner (17 May 1914 – 25 June 1996) was a German fencer. He competed in the team foil and sabre events at the 1952 Summer Olympics.

References

1914 births
1996 deaths
German male fencers
Olympic fencers of West Germany
Fencers at the 1952 Summer Olympics